The 1956 Mitropa Cup was the 16th season of the Mitropa football club tournament. It was won by Vasas who beat Rapid Wien 9–2 in a play-off match, after the two-legged final ended 4–4 on aggregate.

Quarter-finals
Matches played between 24 June and 1 July 1956.

|}

1 Partizan beat Wacker Wien 4–0 in a play-off to qualify for the Semi-finals.

First leg

Second leg

Semi-finals
Matches played between 7 and 14 July 1956.

|}

First leg

Second leg

Final

|}

1 Vasas beat Rapid Wien 9–2 in a play-off to win the Mitropa Cup.

First leg

Second leg

Play-off

See also
1956–57 European Cup

External links
1956 Mitropa Cup at Rec.Sport.Soccer Statistics Foundation

1956
1956–57 in European football
1956–57 in Hungarian football
1956–57 in Yugoslav football
1956–57 in Austrian football
1956–57 in Czechoslovak football